Modern Drunkard is a glossy color periodical humorously promoting the lifestyle of the "functional alcoholic".

History 
Frank Kelly Rich founded Modern Drunkard in 1996. The first issue was 16 photocopied pages with made-up ads; in 2006 its circulation was about 35,000. The magazine runs advertisements from bars in Denver, Minneapolis, Las Vegas and Philadelphia as well as companies selling drinking supplies. The print edition is available at newsstands and also free in bars and liquor stores.

Content 
Regular features include "Booze in the News", "Post Cards from Skid Row" (featuring poetry written by and/or for the inebriated), "Wino Wisdom", "Alcocomics − Cartoons for the sober challenged", and "You Know You're a Drunkard When..." The magazine also features articles on alcohol's place in history, including such topics as the Whiskey Rebellion and President Franklin D. Roosevelt's love of the martini.

The magazine frequently runs pieces arguing against MADD's positions, and in August 2004 had an editorial on the shrinking proof of a bottle of Jack Daniel's.

Online content 

The magazine's website sells paraphernalia bearing its logo and/or phrases related to the magazine itself and to the liberal consumption of alcohol. The Modern Drunkard IRC chatroom is an active communication channel along with the official forums.

Style 
The magazine's artistic style is reminiscent of popular 1950s "men's action" pulp periodicals, with artwork depicting tough, lantern-jawed men and sultry, buxom women.

Modern Drunkard'''s rebellious standard features a martini glass with an olive above two crossed swords. Three letters, M, D and M, appear on the flag and stand for "Modern Drunkard Magazine."

 Staff  
Rich, the magazine's creator, is also listed as the publisher/editor. Staff are allowed to drink (and smoke) on the job and are provided with a bar and a fridge containing beer.

ConventionsModern Drunkard Magazine'' held its first convention for readers and staff in 2004. The convention, held at the Stardust Casino in Las Vegas, reportedly broke the casino's record for the amount of money brought in at a bar during a private event. It became an annual event, advertised as "The best time you’ll never remember" and "Say it loud, say it plowed".

Notes

External links 
 

Lifestyle magazines published in the United States
Mass media in Denver
Magazines published in Colorado
Drinking culture
Bimonthly magazines published in the United States
Magazines established in 1996
Satirical magazines published in the United States
Food and drink magazines